Lullington is a common place-name in England, and may refer to:

Lullington, Derbyshire
Lullington, East Sussex
Lullington, Somerset